The 2016 TAC Cup Nanjing Challenger was a professional tennis tournament played on clay courts. It was the sixth edition of the tournament which was part of the 2016 ATP Challenger Tour. It took place in Nanjing, China between 18 and 24 April 2016.

Singles main-draw entrants

Seeds

 1 Rankings as of 11 April 2016.

Other entrants
The following players received wildcards into the singles main draw:
  Wang Chuhan
  Zeng Shihong
  Zheng Weiqiang
  Gao Xin

The following players received entry from the qualifying draw:
  Riccardo Ghedin
  Václav Šafránek
  Daniel Masur
  Andrew Whittington

Champions

Singles

  Ričardas Berankis def.  Grega Žemlja, 6–3, 6–4

Doubles

  Saketh Myneni /  Jeevan Nedunchezhiyan def.  Denys Molchanov /  Aleksandr Nedovyesov, 6–3, 6–3

External links
Results

TAC Cup Nanjing Challenger
Tennis tournaments in China
2016 in Chinese tennis
April 2016 sports events in China